An army is a fighting force that fights primarily on land.

Army may also refer to:

Arts, entertainment, and media
 Army (1944 film), a Japanese film directed by Keisuke Kinoshita
 Army (1996 film), a Bollywood film
 "Army" (Ben Folds Five song), by Ben Folds Five from their 1999 album The Unauthorized Biography of Reinhold Messner
 "Army" (Ellie Goulding song), by Ellie Goulding from her 2015 album Delirium
 Army (newspaper), an Australian Army publication
 Armando "Army" Renta, a fictional character on The Shield, portrayed by Michael Peña
 Army (International Military-Technical Forum)
 ARMY (아미), an abbreviation for Adorable Representative MC for Youth, fan base of the group BTS

Other uses
 Military, or armed forces
 Field army, a large military formation
 Army Black Knights, the sports teams of the United States Military Academy at West Point
 John Howard (Canadian sprinter) (1888–1937), Canadian sprinter and World War I soldier nicknamed "Army"

See also